Te Hana is a small town on  near the northern boundary of Auckland. Te Hana Creek runs westward on the northern end of the town to the Kaipara Harbour.

History
The town gained a post office in 1871. A school flourished in Te Hana in the early 20th century.

The Port Albert Co-operative Dairy Company replaced its factory in Port Albert with a more substantial one in Te Hana in 1934. The dairy factory was the town's major employer until it closed in 1987. After it closed Te Hana declined, with a high crime rate, unemployment of 20%, significant substance abuse, and poor living conditions. 

Te Hana Community Charitable Development Trust was formed in 2002 to rejuvenate the town, with one of its major initiatives a Māori cultural centre to attract tourists with a recreation of a pre-European Māori village.

Demographics
Te Hana is part of the larger Okahukura Peninsula statistical area.

Te Hana had a population of 105 at the 2018 New Zealand census, an increase of 9 people (9.4%) since the 2013 census, and an increase of 3 people (2.9%) since the 2006 census. There were 33 households, comprising 54 males and 54 females, giving a sex ratio of 1.0 males per female. The median age was 34.9 years (compared with 37.4 years nationally), with 27 people (25.7%) aged under 15 years, 18 (17.1%) aged 15 to 29, 57 (54.3%) aged 30 to 64, and 6 (5.7%) aged 65 or older.

Ethnicities were 65.7% European/Pākehā, 34.3% Māori, 2.9% Pacific peoples, 11.4% Asian, and 2.9% other ethnicities. People may identify with more than one ethnicity.

Although some people chose not to answer the census's question about religious affiliation, 45.7% had no religion, 40.0% were Christian, 5.7% were Hindu and 2.9% had Māori religious beliefs.

Of those at least 15 years old, 6 (7.7%) people had a bachelor's or higher degree, and 15 (19.2%) people had no formal qualifications. The median income was $32,000, compared with $31,800 nationally. 3 people (3.8%) earned over $70,000 compared to 17.2% nationally. The employment status of those at least 15 was that 51 (65.4%) people were employed full-time, 6 (7.7%) were part-time, and 9 (11.5%) were unemployed.

Notes

Rodney Local Board Area
Populated places in the Auckland Region